Hilton is an unincorporated community in Creek County, Oklahoma, United States.

Notable person
James William Lair, Central Intelligence Agency operative, was born in Hilton.

Notes

Unincorporated communities in Creek County, Oklahoma
Unincorporated communities in Oklahoma